The 1900–01 Brown men's ice hockey season was the 4th season of play for the program.

Season
Brown recovered from a dismal season the year before and entered their game against Yale on March 16 with a chance to win their second collegiate championship. Instead, Brown lost their last two games to the Elis, allowing Yale to claim their third consecutive championship.

This was the final season that Brown finished with at least a .500 record until 1926.

Roster

Standings

Schedule and Results

|-
!colspan=12 style=";" | Regular Season

References

Brown Bears men's ice hockey seasons
Brown
Brown
Brown
Brown